John Thomas Pike (18 July 1891 – 17 July 1968) was an Australian rules footballer who played with Essendon in the Victorian Football League (VFL).

Family
The ninth and youngest child of Edward Pike (1848-1896), and Elizabeth Mary Pike (1848-1930), née Purdy, John Thomas Pike was born at Point Nepean, Victoria on 18 July 1891.

Notes

References
 
 Maplestone, M., Flying Higher: History of the Essendon Football Club 1872–1996, Essendon Football Club, (Melbourne), 1996.

External links 

1891 births
1968 deaths
Australian rules footballers from Victoria (Australia)
Essendon Football Club players